The Cincinnati Browns were a professional baseball team in the National Colored Base Ball League, the first attempt at a professional Negro league in 1887. Although the league folded after just one week, the Browns continued to play for a time.

References

Negro league baseball teams
Defunct baseball teams in Ohio
Baseball in Cincinnati
Baseball teams established in 1887
Baseball teams disestablished in 1887